Lucian Piane (born October 4, 1980), also known by the Internet nickname RevoLucian, is an American composer and music producer. He has composed music for several films, television shows, theater productions and singers, and received a RIAA Platinum Album Award for his production work on Hairspray: Soundtrack to the Motion Picture. Piane has also achieved Internet fame under the name RevoLucian for his satirical techno remixes, most notably "Bale Out", which featured profanity-laced tirades from actor Christian Bale made on the set of Terminator Salvation.

Career
Piane graduated from New York University in 2003 with a Bachelor of Music in Composition.  He has worked closely with composer and songwriter Marc Shaiman; the two have collaborated on such films as Team America: World Police, Rumor Has It... and Hairspray, as well as the Broadway show Martin Short: Fame Becomes Me, and the 76th Academy Awards. Piane received a Recording Industry Association of America Platinum Album Award for his production work on New Line Records' Hairspray: Soundtrack to the Motion Picture, which was also nominated for a Grammy Award. Piane scored the music for the 2006 musical In Your Dreams, which was written by Zeke Farrow.

Piane has composed scores for the HBO documentary An Omar Broadway Film and the film Pretty Ugly People. He wrote the song "Year End Rap" which blogger Perez Hilton performed on his VH1 special, What Perez Sez. Piane also wrote the song "Stunning" for Calpernia Addams for her reality television show, Transamerican Love Story. Piane lives in Los Angeles, California, and in 2009 worked on the album Champion by RuPaul. Piane composed the music for the 2009 horror film, Sorority Row, and arranged music for a song and video called "The Clap" by Perez Hilton, recorded for the motion picture soundtrack of the film Another Gay Sequel: Gays Gone Wild. In 2011 he teamed up with RuPaul again producing the album Glamazon. On February 24, 2014
his third album with RuPaul, Born Naked, was released.

Internet remixes
Piane has also achieved Internet fame for his satirical celebrity techno remixes. Published under his online name RevoLucian, Piane has released remixes featuring Barbra Streisand, Alaska Governor Sarah Palin, political commentator Bill O'Reilly, and Andrew Meyer, who received national media attention when he was tasered by police during a speech given by U.S. Senator John Kerry at the University of Florida. Piane has described his remixes as "just a hobby." His remix of Streisand's 2006 outburst was described as a "dance-tastic song" by Maxine Shen and Raakhee Mirchandani of the New York Post who highlighted it on their hot list of "What We're Obsessed With This Week". Louis Bayard of Salon highlighted Piane's remix of the O'Reilly outburst made public in 2008, in their "Critics' Picks" column.

Piane attracted particularly strong attention for "Bale Out" a three-minute-long techno remix featuring audio clips from a profanity-laced tirade actor Christian Bale delivered to cinematographer Shane Hurlbut on the set of Terminator Salvation. Piane made the song shortly after Bale attracted national media attention in February 2009, and "Bale Out" became so popular it attracted media attention itself. He initially heard the audio of Bale while working on an album for RuPaul. The song was posted on the websites MySpace and YouTube on February 2, 2009, and received over 200,000 views within one day. By February 4, 2009, it had received 700,000 views. Regarding the song, Piane said, "I think most people are enjoying it. I don't know if Christian Bale is enjoying it, but I hope he does. I think I've taken something that maybe made him look really bad and turned it into something that all these people are enjoying."  In an interview with E!: Entertainment Television, Christian Bale said of the song, "It was a good remix. They did a good job." After receiving a remix of his outburst from a friend, Bale said, "They did a bloody good job! I've gotta say, what a great impulse, you know? To take something ugly like that and make it into a dance? That's a wonderful thing." McG, the director of Terminator Salvation, has also praised "Bale Out" and has a copy of the song on his iPod.

Controversies

On November 3, 2016, Piane generated controversy when he sent out a series of tweets and Instagram posts that implied the Clintons had murdered people, that Michelle Obama was an "idiot" and various other conspiracies. His tweets were criticized for being racist, often using ethnic slurs. This led to a major backlash against his longstanding ties with RuPaul, who came to Piane's defense, attributing the incidents to mental illness. Piane later claimed he made the posts while in a state of “marijuana psychosis”.

In August 2019, Piane was arrested multiple times, most notably on August 27 after refusing to leave a Chase bank. After the arrests became public knowledge, his family revealed that he was undergoing mental health treatment.

Awards and nominations

See also

List of Internet phenomena
List of YouTube celebrities
List of Rusicals (Piane wrote many of these)
Mashup (music)
Sound collage

References

External links
Official site
RevoLucian YouTube Channel

1980 births
Living people
21st-century American composers
21st-century American male musicians
American male composers
American male songwriters
LGBT people from Missouri
American LGBT songwriters
LGBT record producers
Musicians from Kansas City, Missouri
Musicians from Los Angeles
Record producers from California
American gay musicians
Gay composers
Gay songwriters
Record producers from Missouri
Remixers
Steinhardt School of Culture, Education, and Human Development alumni
20th-century American LGBT people
21st-century American LGBT people